Trichanthemis is a genus of Central Asian plants in the chamomile tribe within the daisy family.
 Species
 Trichanthemis afghanica Podlech - Afghanistan
 Trichanthemis aulieatensis (B.Fedtsch.) Krasch. - Kazakhstan, Uzbekistan, Kyrgyzstan
 Trichanthemis aurea Krasch. - Kazakhstan, Uzbekistan
 Trichanthemis butkovii Kovalevsk. - Kazakhstan, Uzbekistan, Kyrgyzstan
 Trichanthemis glabriflora Novopokr. & Sidorenko
 Trichanthemis karataviensis Regel & Schmalh. - Kazakhstan, Uzbekistan, Kyrgyzstan, Tajikistan, Siberia (Altay, Irkutsk)
 Trichanthemis litwinowii (Krasch.) Tzvelev  - Kazakhstan, Uzbekistan, Kyrgyzstan
 Trichanthemis paradoxa Tzvelev
 Trichanthemis paradoxos (C.Winkl.) Tzvelev - Kazakhstan, Uzbekistan, Kyrgyzstan
 Trichanthemis radiata Krasch. & Vved. - Kazakhstan, Uzbekistan, Kyrgyzstan

References

Asteraceae genera
Anthemideae